Epsilonematidae is a family of nematodes belonging to the order Desmodorida.

Genera

Genera:
 Akanthepsilonema Gourbault & Decraemer, 1991
 Archepsilonema Steiner, 1927
 Bathyepsilonema Steiner, 1927

References

Nematodes